Ingram de Balliol (died 1244), Lord of Redcastle and Urr in Scotland, Dalton in England and Tours-en-Vimeu in France was an Anglo Scoto-French noble.

He was a younger son of Eustace de Balliol and Petronilla FitzPiers. Ingram was a follower of King Alexander II of Scotland, which brought him against his brothers Hugh and Bernard, who supported Kings John and Henry III of England. He died in 1244.

Marriage and issue
Ingram married Agnes, daughter and heiress of Walter de Berkeley of Redcastle. They are known to have had the following known issue. 
Eustace de Balliol of Tours.
Ellen de Balliol (died 1281), married William de Percy of Topcliffe. Dalton passed into the Percy family.
Henry de Balliol of Redcastle and Urr.
Eva de Balliol, married Robert de Umfraville of Collerton, had issue.

Citations

References

Year of birth unknown
1244 deaths